The men's madison competition at the 2019 UEC European Track Championships was held on 20 October 2019.

Results
200 laps (50 km) with 20 sprints were raced.

References

Men's madison
European Track Championships – Men's madison